John Komlos (born 28 December 1944) is an American economic historian of Hungarian descent and former holder of the chair of economic history at the University of Munich.

Personal life
Komlos was born in 1944 in Budapest in Hungary during the Holocaust. After becoming refugees during the 1956 revolution, his family fled to the United States where Komlos finally grew up in Chicago.

Career
Komlos received a PhD in history in 1978 and a second PhD in economics in 1990 from the University of Chicago. After inspired by Robert Fogel to work on the history of human height, Komlos devoted most of his academic career developing and expanding the research agenda that became known as Anthropometric history, the study of the effect of economic development on human biology as indicated by the physical stature or the obesity rate prevalence of a population.

Komlos was a fellow at the Carolina Population Center of the University of North Carolina at Chapel Hill from 1984 to 1986. He worked as a professor of economics and of economic history at the University of Munich for eighteen years before his retirement.

In 2003, Komlos founded Economics and Human Biology, a quarterly peer-reviewed academic journal covering research on biological economics, economics in the context of human biology and health. In 2013, he was elected a Fellow of the Cliometric Society.

Works

References

External links
 List of publications
 

Economic historians
Hungarian emigrants to the United States
1944 births
Living people
Duke University faculty
Academic journal editors
Auxologists